Koronowo may refer to the following places:
Koronowo, Greater Poland Voivodeship (west-central Poland)
Koronowo in Kuyavian-Pomeranian Voivodeship (north-central Poland)
Koronowo, Warmian-Masurian Voivodeship (north Poland)